The USC Trojans women's basketball team, or the Women of Troy, is the collegiate women's basketball team that represents the University of Southern California, in the Pac-12 Conference. The team rose to prominence in 1976, at which time scholarships became available to female basketball players. They were the first Division I team to give these scholarships.

History
The Women of Troy made their first appearance in the Final Four in the 1981 AIAW Tournament. Following the successful 1982 season, in which USC reached the Elite Eight of the first NCAA tournament, the Trojans went on to win national championships in 1983 and 1984. The 1983 championship team included three All-Americans, Paula McGee, Cheryl Miller, and Rhonda Windham. The 1983 team went 31–2 in the regular and post-season combined. The 1983 team bested their opponent, Louisiana Tech, by a mere 2 points. The final score was 69–67. The 1984 championship team went 29–4 in the regular and post season. The 1984 team faced University of Tennessee. The victory this year came by a healthy eleven points. The final score was 72–61. USC made the National Championship again in 1986 but did not prevail. They lost to University of Texas 97–81. They since have yet to appear in the National Championship.

In 1987 and 1994 the Trojans won the Pac-10 Championship. The Trojans had begun their longest playoff drought in 1998, which was broken when the team made it to the playoff bracket in 2005. Not until 2011 did the Trojans make it to the postseason again. In 2006 USC opened the Galen Center, which was the new home of the Women of Troy. It can seat over 10,000 fans, and it was sold out in 2007 for a game between the Trojans and the UCLA Bruins. It was the first time in history that an NCAA women's basketball game was sold out. Every year since 1986, at least one member of the Trojans team has been honored in the Pac-10 awards. To date, eleven players who played for USC have won Olympic medals.

Given USC's early and iconic development of women's basketball, the legacy was featured in an HBO documentary entitled "Women of Troy," which premiered on March 10, 2020.

Notable players
 Michelle Campbell, played 1993–1997, then played for the Washington Mystics of the WNBA in 2000.
 Cynthia Cooper, played 1982–1986. Cooper helped lead the team to its only national championships (1983, 1984) and in 1988 won an Olympic gold medal with the U.S. national basketball team in Seoul. She also played with the Houston Comets in the WNBA, where the team won titles in 1997, 1998, 1999, and 2000. Signed as head coach at Prairie View A&M University in 2005, then UNC Wilmington in 2010, followed by Texas Southern in 2012. She became the USC head coach for the 2013–14 season.
Jacki Gemelos, played 2009–2012. She played on various WNBA teams as well as the Greek women's national basketball team. She is currently an assistant coach for the New York Liberty.
 Lisa Leslie, played 1990–1994. She set many records in points and rebounds, and in 1994, she was National Player of the Year. She got a contract with the WNBA in 1997, becoming one of the new league's first players, where she joined the Los Angeles Sparks.  In 2001, she was the first WNBA player to win the regular season MVP, the All-Star Game MVP and the playoff MVP in the same season. Lisa also led the Los Angeles Sparks to two back-to-back WNBA Championships (2001, 2002). Lisa won 4 Olympic gold medals and was the first woman in the WNBA to make a slam-dunk during an official game. In 2009 she retired and is now a team owner of the Los Angeles Sparks.
 Nicky McCrimmon, played 1992–1994, then for the Los Angeles Sparks in 2000, and Houston Comets in 2005.
Pamela McGee, played 1980–1984. She was a part of the NCAA championship team and earned an Olympic Gold for the United States in 1984. She also played in the WNBA.
Dr. Paula McGee, played 1980–1984. She was a part of the NCAA championship team and is currently an academic and a public theologian.
Cheryl Miller, played 1982–1986. She led the Women of Troy to two National Championships (1983, 1984) and won the NCAA tournament MVP both years. She also coached for the Women of Troy for 2 seasons (1993–1995). In her 2 seasons she had a combined 44–14 record and went to the NCAA tournament both seasons, making a Regional Final once. She then went on to coach in the WNBA for the Phoenix Mercury (1997–2000). She was inducted to the Women's Basketball Hall of Fame in 1999.
Shay Murphy, played 2003–2007. She was a member of the Phoenix Mercury in 2014, when the squad won the WNBA championship.
 Tina Thompson, played 1993–1997. Thompson led USC to the NCAA tournament 3 times (1994, 1995, 1997) and to one Elite 8 (1994). In 1994 she was named Freshmen of the Year in the Pac-10 Conference and Freshmen All-America by Basketball Times. In 1997 she was the first overall draft pick in the WNBA by the Houston Comets, she became the first draftee in the history of the WNBA. She helped lead the Comets to 4 WNBA Championships in 1997, 1998, 1999 and 2000. Thompson played for Houston Comets from 1997 to 2008, the Los Angeles Sparks from 2009 to 2011, and the Seattle Storm from 2012 to 2013. 
 Adrian Williams, played 1995–1999, then for the Minnesota Lynx, 2006–2007.

Head coaches
Linda Sharp (1977–1989) led the Women of Troy to 2 NCAA National Women Championships, 3 final four appearances. She ended her record with the Women of Troy with a 271–99 and was inducted into the Women's Basketball Hall of Fame in 2001.
Marianne Stanley (1989–1993) led the Women of Troy to the NCAA tournament 3 years in a row and recruited future WNBA Stars Lisa Leslie, Tina Thompson and Nicky McCrimmon. She has been inducted into the Women's Basketball Hall of Fame in 2002.
Cheryl Miller (1993–1995) coached only 2 seasons for the Women of Troy. In her 2 seasons she had a combined 44–14 record and went to the NCAA tournament both seasons, making a Regional Final once. Cheryl Miller is also a former player of the Women of Troy where she led the Women of Troy to two National Championships (1983, 1984) and won the NCAA tournament MVP both years. She then went on to coach in the WNBA for the Phoenix Mercury (1997–2000). She was inducted to the Women's Basketball Hall of Fame in 1999. 
Fred Willams (1995–1997) was assistant coach prior to serving as head coach. He went to coach in the WNBA after his final season at USC.
Chris Gobrecht (1997–2004) played for the Women of Troy from 1974 to 1976.
Mark Trakh (2004–2009) & (2017–2021) had two stints with the Women of Troy. His squads reached the NCAA tournament twice.
Michael Cooper (2009–2013) resigned as head coach for the Women of Troy. Of his 4-season he ended with a record of 61–37 (.622).
Cynthia Cooper-Dyke (2013–2017) a former Women of Troy player, who helped lead the team to its only National Championships (1983, 1984) and in 1988 won an Olympic gold medal with the U.S. national basketball team in Seoul. She also played with the Houston Comets in the WNBA, where she led the team to a record four consecutive WNBA championships (1997–2000). She took the head coaching job for the USC Women of Troy for the 2013–2014 season and remained until 2017.
Lindsay Gottlieb (2021–) joined the Women of Troy after two seasons with the Cleveland Cavaliers as an assistant coach. Prior to her time in the NBA, Gottlieb was the head coach at California for 8 seasons, leading the team to 7 NCAA tournaments, including one final four appearance.

Arenas
Los Angeles Memorial Sports Arena was the Women of Troy's arena from 1977 until 2006. The Los Angeles Memorial Sports Arena was opened in 1959. 
Galen Center, which is 255,000 square feet, with a 45,000-square-foot pavilion, and has three practice courts and offices. The seating capacity is 10,258, and there are 22 private suites. Total construction cost was an estimated $147 million. The working of the Galen Center started in 2004 by a donation of $50 million by Louis Galen (a successful banker and long-time Trojan fan). The Galen Center opened in 2006.

Roster

Year by year results

Conference tournament winners noted with #

|-style="background: #ffffdd;"
| colspan="8" align="center" | Pac-12 Conference

Postseason results

NCAA Division I

AIAW Division I
The Trojans made two appearances in the AIAW National Division I basketball tournament, with a combined record of 2–3.

Awards and achievements

Retired numbers

Career leaders

References

External links
 

Official Twitter: https://twitter.com/USCWBB

Fan Forum: https://www.uscbasketball.com/forum/the-lyon-center